The Salimiyya Takiyya is a takiyya (Ottoman-era Arabic name for a mosque complex which served as a Sufi convent) in as-Salihiyya, Damascus.

The complex was built over and in the surroundings of Ibn Arabi's tomb in 924/1518 by the Ottoman sultan Selim I upon his return from the conquest of Egypt. The Salimiyya Takiyya is considered to have been "the first Ottoman building in Syria". However, its construction is considered to have followed "a local architectural idiom", which was "neither Mamluk, nor Ottoman" (unlike the later Sulaymaniyya Takiyya, which marked the introduction of the Ottoman architectural style to Damascus).

The Salimiyya Takiyya consists of a mosque (Ibn Arabi Mosque) and an imaret facing it.

History
Quoting Steve Tamari:

Notes

References

1518 establishments in Ottoman Syria
Buildings and structures in Damascus